The 1992/93 NTFL season was the 72nd season of the Northern Territory Football League (NTFL).

The Wanderers Eagles have won there 10th premiership title while defeating St Marys in the grand final by 51 points.

Grand Final

References

Northern Territory Football League seasons
NTFL